Jinan East railway station is a high-speed railway station in Licheng District, Jinan, the capital of Shandong province, China. The station is located on the east-west Jinan–Qingdao high-speed railway.

It is the third major station in Jinan, following Jinan railway station and Jinan West railway station.

History
The station opened on 26 December 2018 with the Jinan–Qingdao high-speed railway.

Metro station
It is served by a station on Line 3 of the Jinan Metro.

References

Railway stations in Shandong
Railway stations in China opened in 2018
Transport in Jinan
Stations on the Qingdao–Taiyuan High-Speed Railway